Chandrahasa is a 1965 Indian Kannada-language film, directed by B. S. Ranga and produced by B. S. Ranga. The film stars Rajkumar, Udaykumar, K. S. Ashwath and Narasimharaju. The film had musical score by S. Hanumantha Rao.

The story is based on a portion of Kannada poet Lakshmeesha's epic Jaimini Bharatha about the life of Kuntala king Chandrahasa. Actress Jayanthi had a guest appearance in the climax of this movie as Goddess Kaali and Rajkumar sings Maata marakathashyama maatangi madhushaalini in her praise. B. S. Ranga shot the movie simultaneously in Telugu as Chandrahasa starring Gummadi.

Cast

Rajkumar
Udaykumar
K. S. Ashwath
Narasimharaju
Rathnakar
Sudarshan
Master Babu
R. Nagendra Rao in Guest Appearance
Jayanthi in Guest Appearance
Srikanth
A. V. Subba Rao
Krishna Shastry
Vijayarao
Kashinath
Subramanyam
Hanumantha Rao
Shivaji Rao
Srinivasa Rao
Kasthuriraj
L. N. Swamy
Leelavathi
Vanisri
Pandari Bai
Suryakala
Sabithadevi
Rama
B. Jaya
Radhakumari

Soundtrack 
"Kaviya Madhura Kalpane" (P. B. Sreenivas,S. Janaki)
"Baa Baa Bayasida Banasiri Baa" (Amirbai Karnataki)
"Pampaa Chiranagari" (Vijaya Desai)
"Panchaamrutha" (G.T. Balakrishna,Neelagaara)
"Sri Sheshashayana" (P. Leela)
"Yaava Kaviya Shrungaara Kalpaneyo (Ghantasala, Bangalore Latha)

References

External links
 

1965 films
1960s Kannada-language films
Indian biographical films
Films based on the Mahabharata
Films scored by S. Hanumantha Rao
Films directed by B. S. Ranga
1960s biographical films